In mid-2019, writer E. Jean Carroll accused then-U.S.-president Donald Trump of sexually assaulting her in the mid-1990s. Trump denied the allegations. In November 2019, Carroll sued Trump in New York Supreme Court for defamation. In September 2020, U.S. Justice Department lawyers asserted that Trump had acted in his official capacity while responding to Carroll's accusation. In November 2022, Carroll expanded her claim to battery and filed a second lawsuit against Trump under the Adult Survivors Act, a New York law that allows sexual-assault victims to file civil suits beyond expired statutes of limitations. The trial was scheduled for April 25, 2023, with uncertainty remaining about whether the two related suits will be combined.

Potential evidence in the case includes statements from witnesses Carroll reputedly told about the alleged incident, unidentified male DNA detected on a dress Carroll said she was wearing, and a photograph of her with Trump in 1987.

Background

On June 21, 2019, prior to the release of her book What Do We Need Men For?: A Modest Proposal (and during the Trump administration), E. Jean Carroll wrote in New York magazine that Donald Trump had sexually assaulted her in late 1995 or early 1996 in the Bergdorf Goodman department store in New York City. Her book contains details of the alleged incident. Carroll said that on her way out of the store she ran into Trump and he asked for help buying a gift for a woman. After suggesting a handbag or a hat, the two reputedly moved on to the lingerie section and joked about the other trying some on. Carroll said they ended up a dressing room together, the door of which was shut, and Trump forcefully kissed her, pulled down her tights and raped her before she was able to escape. She stated that the alleged incident lasted less than three minutes, during which time there was no sales attendant present in the department. Lisa Birnbach and Carol Martin told New York magazine that Carroll had confided with them after the alleged assault.

In an official government statement, Trump said that he had "never met [Carroll] in my life", accused her of trying to sell books and implied she had a political agenda, compared the accusation to one against Supreme Court Justice Brett Kavanaugh, and said Bergdorf Goodman had confirmed they had no surveillance footage of the alleged incident. Trump further called on the public to provide information indicating that Carroll was conspiring with the Democratic Party or New York magazine. Trump separately stated in an interview with The Hill that Carroll was "totally lying" and that "she's not my type." Carroll provided New York a photograph of her and her husband at the time, John Johnson, socializing with Trump and his then-wife, Ivana Trump, in 1987. Trump dismissed its significance, saying, "Standing with my coat on in a line — give me a break — with my back to the camera. I have no idea who she is."

Carroll initially chose not to describe the alleged sexual assault as rape, instead describing it as a fight. "My word is fight. My word is not the victim word... I fought."

Overview

Initial defamation lawsuit (November 2019)

In November 2019, Carroll filed a defamation lawsuit with the New York Supreme Court. The suit states that Trump had damaged her reputation, substantially harmed her professionally, and caused emotional pain. After it was filed, White House press secretary Stephanie Grisham described the lawsuit as "frivolous" and claimed Carrolll’s story was fraudulent.

In January 2020, Carroll's attorneys served a request for a DNA sample from Trump for "analysis and comparison against unidentified male DNA present" on a black dress she said she was wearing when the alleged assault occurred. In December 2020, Carroll said she was willing to delay collecting the sample and testimony from Trump in exchange for earlier access to other relevant records. The DNA sample request includes a DNA report on Carroll and five others who may have contacted the dress during a photo shoot.

In September 2020, government lawyers from the Department of Justice (DOJ) asserted that Trump had acted in his official capacity while responding to Carroll's accusation; they asserted that the Federal Tort Claims Act grants their department the right to take the case from Trump's private lawyers and move it to federal court. A White House official also argued that the act provides precedent for the government to exercise this right. Carroll's lawyer, Roberta A. Kaplan, stated that "Trump's effort to wield the power of the U.S. government to evade responsibility for his private misconduct is without precedent." In October 2020, U.S. District Court Judge Lewis Kaplan (not related) rejected the DOJ's motion, arguing that the president is not a government employee and that Trump's comments were not related to his job as such. The following month, the DOJ filed an appeal with the Second Circuit Court of Appeals.

In June 2021 (during the Biden administration), the DOJ argued to the Second Circuit appeals court that DOJ lawyers should defend Trump as a federal employee, stating, "Speaking to the public and the press on matters of public concern is undoubtedly part of an elected official's job." On September 27, 2022, the appeals court ruled that "we cannot say what the District would do" in terms of allowing Trump to be shielded by his former office as U.S. president. Habba praised the ruling as a reversal of the District Court's stance (that the comments were not executive business).

On October 12, 2022, after Judge Kaplan denied Trump's request to delay his deposition as a witness in the case the following week, Trump made a lengthy post on Truth Social in which he claimed that the case was "a complete con job", asserting that Carroll's only connection to him was that she had a photograph of them in a line at a celebrity event.

Trump's deposition (October 2022) 

Trump was deposed by Roberta Kaplan on October 19, 2022. Trump asserted that he usually had security guards with him but could not name who would have been working in such a capacity at the relevant time. He denied reaching out to Bergdorf Goodman ahead of his statements in 2019, arguing that "if it did happen, it would have been reported within minutes." He accused Carroll and her lawyer of being "aligned with Hillary Clinton" based on "somebody [having] mentioned it", but admitted that he had no knowledge of Carroll's political party or documentary evidence of her pursuing a political agenda, before going on to repeatedly accuse Kaplan of being a political operative of Clinton or the Democratic Party. When asked if anyone had given him information on Carroll conspiring with that party or New York magazine, Trump said, "I'll let you know." He threatened to sue both Carroll and Kaplan after the proceedings were complete, implying that Carroll's suit was an attempt to sabotage his 2024 presidential campaign, stating, "this is the way you defeat [me], to keep [me] busy with litigation." Additionally, Trump called the litigation a "hoax" along the lines of "The Russia Russia Russia hoax [and the] Ukraine Ukraine Ukraine hoax" and reiterated that he did not know Carroll before she sued him (calling her a "nut job", asserting that she "actually indicated that she loved [the alleged assault]" and "said it was very sexy to be raped"). When asked if "Carroll said that she loved being sexually assaulted" by him, Trump responded, "Well, based on her interview with Anderson Cooper, I believe that's what took place." When shown the photograph of Carroll socializing with Trump in 1987, Trump thought the former was his ex-wife Marla Maples until Habba righted him. When asked if he had made the statements in the famous Access Hollywood tape (e.g. "when you're a star, [beautiful women] let you do it ... grab 'em by the pussy"), Trump responded, "Well, historically, that's true with stars." He agreed that he could be described as a "star".

Expansion to battery claim (November 2022) 

On November 24, 2022, Carroll sued Trump for battery under the Adult Survivors Act (a law passed the previous May which allows sexual-assault victims to file civil suits beyond expired statutes of limitations) and made a renewed claim of defamation, citing statements Trump made on Truth Social in October. The suit alleges that the battery left Carroll unable to develop sexual relationships. Carroll's lawyer proposed a trial date of April 10, 2023. Lawyers for Trump said in a December 19 court filing that they would request a dismissal of the lawsuit partially on the basis that the New York law is invalid due to its allegedly contradicting the state's constitution regarding due process. Judge Kaplan set a trial date of April 17 and denied the request to dismiss the lawsuit, which Habba said the defense intended to "immediately appeal".

The transcripts of Trump's deposition were released on January 13, 2023. Kaplan rescheduled the trial to start on April 25 but left it open as to whether Carroll's two related suits would be consolidated. Trump and Carroll are expected to be called as witnesses, as well as those Carroll said she told about the incident, and others, including Anderson Cooper.

In January 2023, the District of Columbia (D.C.) appeals court held oral arguments before a full panel of judges. Trump's lawyers argued that his comments fell within the scope of his employment, while some judges pointed out that D.C. law holds employers responsible when their employees cause individuals harm in the scope of their employment but not otherwise. Judge Catharine F. Easterly noted that employer liability cases usually have a trial record and jury verdict to refer to, while Judge John P. Howard questioned whether further fact-finding was warranted.

On January 31, 2023, Joe Tacopina became Trump's lead lawyer in the case. On February 10, Tacopina indicated that Trump would be willing to provide a DNA sample, stating that "Mr. Trump's DNA is either on the dress or it is not," but stipulated that an appendix from Carroll's report (regarding her own DNA) must first be proffered and dictated that Trump's DNA would be submitted for the "sole purpose of comparing it to the DNA found on the dress". Stating that Trump had known about the DNA request for over three years, Carroll's lawyer asserted that the motion was a "bad-faith effort to taint the potential jury pool, upend this Court's discovery orders, and delay these proceedings". On February 15, Judge Kaplan dismissed Trump's offer as an out-of-line delay tactic. Further, the judge argued that the presence of Trump's DNA would not conclusively prove whether a rape occurred as no sperm cells were noted in the report.

On February 16, Trump's lawyers requested that two separate sexual-assault allegations from Jessica Leeds and Natasha Stoynoff (who both allege that Trump began groping them without permission) and the Access Hollywood tape involving him be barred as evidence in the Carroll trial (the latter having been cited by Carroll's lawyer as evidence of a larger pattern of sexual misconduct). Carroll's counsel requested that the women who made the other two allegations be allowed to testify in her case as they demonstrate a "consistent pattern". On March 2, Trump's lawyers again asked for the tape's dismissal, arguing that it does not demonstrate a pattern of behavior consistent with Carroll's accusation. According to Habba, Trump denied that the behavior he described in the tape "ever actually occurred". On March 10, Judge Kaplan ruled that the tape and the testimonies of Leeds and Stoynoff would be admissible at trial.

In mid-February, the defense sought to conduct an expert-witness medical examination on Carroll (barred from directly evaluating the rape claim but seeking to evaluate whether their was resulting emotional damage). Following a conflict regarding scheduling and the availability of specific doctors, the defense counsel determined that was unethical to proceed with the evaluation "as limited by the current court order" and requested a two-week delay. On February 23, Trump's lawyers requested that the defamation claim in the second lawsuit be dismissed, arguing that his Truth Social post from October was merely a response regarding the first lawsuit which mostly repeated previous positions (despite making original incursions), and was thus protected under supposed "absolute litigation privilege" provided by New York State Civil Rights Law § 74.

On March 11, Judge Kaplan asked Trump and Carroll to respond by March 17 if they had any objection to the use of an anonymous jury, which Bloomberg interpreted as "a clear signal that [the judge is] concerned about the privacy of jurors who will hand down a verdict in a politically charged case involving a 2024 presidential candidate."

See also
 List of lawsuits involving Donald Trump

References
Footnotes

Citations

2019 scandals
Donald Trump controversies
Scandals in the United States
Sexual misconduct allegations